Margarita Sánchez Gutiérrez (born December 26, 1953 in Málaga), also known as the "Black Widow of Barcelona" and "The Black Widow of Hospitalet", was a Spanish serial killer who received her name for her method of murder - by poisoning the food and drinks she offered her victims. She managed to kill four people and poisoned three others who managed to survive. All of the victims were close to her, including family members and neighbors.

Biography 
When she moved to Catalonia she first lived in L'Hospitalet de Llobregat, on Riera Blanca Street, where she was known as "la bizca". This was a modest neighbourhood of workers, where she was considered a troubled woman, but without a criminal record. According to neighbors, she was prone to insults and street fights, and had debts in some shops in the area; she was greedy and seemingly illiterate according to what she declared to police. In 1991 Margarita moved with her husband, Luis Navarro, and their children Sonia and Javi to their in-laws' floor, partly because they had been discouraged but also to take care of her husband's father. Margarita and Carmen Nuez, her mother-in-law, did not get along because apparently the latter was a woman of authority and great character. In 1992, the father-in-law died and Carmen was hospitalized five times in the Clinical Hospital where she proclaimed her daughter-in-law is poisoning her. However, the performing analyzers gave a negative results. Currently, since 2016 she lives in the La Maurina neighborhood of Terrassa.

Sentence 
Margarita Sánchez Gutiérrez was sentenced to 34 years in prison for three crimes of injury, another three for robbery with violence and one crime for falsehood. She was acquitted of the murders when no cases of death due to cyanide were detected and because Margarita's intention was to drug and rob her relatives, not to kill them, according to the justice.

See also
List of serial killers by country

References 

1953 births
Living people
People from Málaga
Poisoners
Spanish female murderers
Spanish female serial killers